This is a list of railway lines in Bulgaria focusing primarily on intercity train lines.

Train railways, as well as related infrastructure such as stations, are managed and maintained by the National Railway Infrastructure Company, which split from Bulgarian State Railways (BDZ) - Bulgaria's national rail company - in 2002. The National Railway Infrastructure Company holds a virtual monopoly on ownership and works closely with the State Railways.

Non-train rail transport in Bulgaria is limited to tram and metro services in Sofia, both managed by their own municipality-owned companies.

Active lines 

Bolded indicates main lines. Italics indicate narrow-gauge lines.

Urban rail transport 
The capital Sofia is the only Bulgarian city with an urban rail network. These include trams and subway trains. Until 1964, a ring railway connected a number of train stations within Sofia. This abandoned railway has seen renewed interest in 2019, with proposals to either partially restore and use it for connections to Sofia Airport and subway stations, convert it into a "green ring route" for bicycles, or both. In May 2020, it was decided that parts of this railway will not be restored for train movement, but for bicycles and pedestrians instead.

Sofia's urban rail network is nevertheless integrated with the national railway network. Both the tram network and Sofia Metro have stations at Sofia Central Station, the central hub for several of the main train lines in Bulgaria.

Trams 

The Sofiya tram network uses two gauges - 1009 mm (39,72 inches) and standard 1435 mm (56,49 inches).

Metro 

The only subway system in operation is also located in Sofia. It was unveiled in 1998 and has four lines with a total length of 52 km 32 mi and 47 stations. metropolitan.bg web site

See also 
 Highways in Bulgaria

References

External links 
 National Railway Infrastructure Company

List
Bulgaria